Michael Armstrong (1924–1982) was a Northern Irish politician, barrister and soldier.

Born in France, Armstrong studied law at Cambridge University and practised as a barrister before embarking on a military career. At the outbreak of the Second World War he enlisted as an officer in the Irish Guards and retired as a captain in 1945, having served with the Allied occupation government of Germany. He subsequently served with the Ulster Special Constabulary and was a district commander in this group when it was disbanded in 1970. He was then a commander in the County Armagh company of the Ulster Defence Regiment until 1974.

Armstrong was a member of the Ulster Unionist Party and in 1975 was elected as a delegate to the Northern Ireland Constitutional Convention for Armagh. He also served as honorary secretary of the Ulster Unionist Council as UUP spokesman on defence and security issues.

He was killed in a car crash in 1982.

References

1924 births
1982 deaths
Place of birth missing
Ulster Unionist Party politicians
Members of the Northern Ireland Constitutional Convention
Barristers from Northern Ireland
British Army personnel of World War II
Irish Guards officers
Ulster Special Constabulary officers
Ulster Defence Regiment officers
Alumni of the University of Cambridge
Road incident deaths in Northern Ireland